Leetham is a surname. Notable people with the surname include:

Grant Leetham, character in Utopia (British TV series)
Chris Leetham, played in 2000 IIHF Asian Oceanic Junior U18 Championship
William Leetham, mayor of Margate
Rob Leetham, actor in The Boy with a Thorn in His Side